The Bullard Hotel, at 105 S. Bullard St. in Silver City, New Mexico, was built in 1916.  It was listed on the National Register of Historic Places in 1988.

It was built by contractor Hugh S. Gilbert.

It is Early Commercial architecture in style.

References

		
National Register of Historic Places in Grant County, New Mexico
Late 19th and Early 20th Century American Movements architecture
Commercial buildings completed in 1916
Early Commercial architecture in the United States